Dunoyer de Segonzac may refer to 

 André Dunoyer de Segonzac, French painter
 Benoit Dunoyer de Segonzac, French musician
 Louis Dunoyer de Segonzac, French physicist